Timbiriche Vaselina is the 5th album from Mexican pop music Group Timbiriche. It was released on 1984. Based on the Musical Grease (musical). Presented by Luis De Llano, Produced by Julissa.

Track listing

 "Alma mater" 
 "El raton" 
 "Noches de verano"  Summer Nights 
 "Amor primero" (Those Magic Changes)
 "Freddy mi amor" (Freddy, My Love) 
 "Rayo rebelde" (Greased Lighting)
 "Los tristones" (Mooning)
 "Sandra Dee" (Look at Me, I'm Sandra Dee) 
 "Iremos juntos" (We Go Together) 
 "Baile escolar" (Rock 'N' Roll Is Here To Stay)
 "Hay lluvia en la noche del baile"  (It's Raining on Prom Night)  
 "El rock nacio conmigo" (Born To Hand Jive)
 "Vuelve a la escuela" (Beauty School Drop Out)
 "El autocinema" (Alone At The Drive-In-Movie)
 "Reina de la fiesta" (Rock 'N' Roll Party Queen)
 "Cosas peores" (There Are Worse Things I Could Do)
 "Reprise de Sandra dee"  (Look at Me, I'm Sandra Dee (Reprise))
 "Flechado estoy"

References

1984 albums
Timbiriche albums